Known as the father of bondkomik (rustic humor), Jödde i Göljaryd (1855–1900) was a beloved storyteller, whose folk humor and songs dominated popular culture in Sweden during the 1890s.

The entertainer, whose real name was Karl Petter Rosén, was famous for his stone – Jödde’s Stone – which can still be seen at the open-air museum of Skansen in Stockholm's Djurgården park. 1893 was the year he began performing at Skansen with every manner of story and anecdote, often in the dialect of Småland, and with homey songs of a rural nature.

In 1899 and 1900 Rosén published two collections of songs and stories gathered during his travels through Sweden. His songbooks — like those of his contemporary Lars Bondeson — were highly influential and an important source of material for the next generation of bondkomiker (rustic comics). America's foremost Swedish comedian, Olle i Skratthult, had three songs and three stories by Jödde i Göljaryd in his first songbook and went on to record four of Jödde's songs in the 1920s: Alundavisan, Beväringsvisa, I Värmeland där ä dä så gutt, gutt, gutt and Ja' gick mig ut en sommardag.

References

External links 
Jödde i Göljaryd photo
Jödde i Göljaryd profile 
Jödde i Göljaryd songbook 
Olle i Skratthult 1908 songbook
Jödde i Göljaryd audio at the Internet Archive

Swedish comedy writers
Swedish entertainers
Swedish folk-song collectors
Swedish songwriters
Swedish-language writers